Kyengera is a town in the Central Region of Uganda. It is one of the urban centers in Wakiso District.

As of 2014, the town has a population of 198.

Location
The town is on the tarmacked, all-weather Kampala-Masaka Highway. The coordinates of the town are 0°17'46.0"N, 32°30'19.0"E (Latitude:0.296112; Longitude:32.505275).

Points of interest
The following points of interest lie within the town limits or near the edges of town:
 Offices of Kyengera Town Council.
 Mugwanya Summit College (Secondary School)
 Kyengera is the first urban centre enroute Southwest upon exiting both the Northern Bypass and Entebbe Airport Expressway, whose interchange is Busega Roundabout in Busega - Located  on the edge of Kampala city, about (2.5 miles) north of Kyengera. The roundabout is the western endpoint of the Kampala Northern Bypass Highway and is the northern endpoint of the Entebbe-Kampala Expressway
 Kyengera Police Station - An establishment of the Uganda National Police
 King's College Budo- a school founded in 1905 to educate Uganda's aristocrats 
 Trinity College Nabbingo- one of the best known Catholic girls schools in Uganda 
 St Mark's Church Nsangi opened in the 1930s
 Nsangi Primary School opened in 1913
 Kalema's Kkomera where dozens of Buganda royals were incarcerated in the 1890s by King Abdul Kalema
 Naggalabi Buddo site where Buganda coronations have been held since the 1500s
 Mugwanya Preparatory School that was founded by the Brothers of Christian Instruction
 Nalumunye Housing Estate
 Majority of villages in Kyengera have very poor phone network on both MTN and Airtel lines

References

External links
  Kyengera, A Place That Never Sleeps

Wakiso District
Populated places in Central Region, Uganda